Creature Catalogue is a supplement for Basic Dungeons & Dragons first released in 1986, and updated in 1993.

Contents
The Creature Catalogue is a supplement which describes over 200 monsters, most of which had been collected from D&D rules and modules, as well as 80 new monsters which had never been printed before; each monster is illustrated and indexed by habitat.

In Creature Catalogue is collected all the creatures first presented in the official D&D adventure modules to that time, plus many new creatures and some converted from AD&D. Also included is a comprehensive index of all D&D monsters found in the Basic, Expert, Companion and Master rulesets.

Each creature in the book is illustrated, and the entries in the book are ordered by type rather than just alphabetically. This includes six sections: Animals (including giant and extinct varieties), Conjurations (such as elementals and golems), Humanoids, Lowlife (including insects, plants, and jellies and slimes), Monsters (a catch-all category), and Undead. The Intelligence score of each monster is listed with the rest of its statistics. The book also includes a comprehensive index of all monsters by environment, and Frank Mentzer's guide on how to balance encounters according to the levels of the player characters, originally printed in the Master Set, is reproduced in the introduction.

Each creature is listed with appropriate D&D statistics and a short description of the creature, its abilities and tactics. A variety of authors and artists combined to the listings including Zeb Cook and Gary Gygax.

Publication history
AC9 Creature Catalogue was compiled by Graeme Morris, Phil Gallagher, and Jim Bambra, and was published by TSR in 1986. The Creature Catalogue is in the format of a 96-page perfect-bound book, which TSR had been adopting more frequently at the time. Cover art is by Keith Parkinson.

An updated version, titled Creature Catalog, was released in March 1993 as accessory "DMR2", part of the "Challenger Series" of Basic D&D accessories that followed the 1991 release of the revised "black box" basic set and the Rules Cyclopedia.

Reception
Tim Brinsley reviewed the Creature Catalogue for White Dwarf #85. Brinsley quipped that the book "is basically a Monster Manual for the D&D game". He noted that the book was produced in the UK, and believed that unlike TSR UK's last attempt at a monster book, "the disappointing Fiend Folio with its many one-use creatures", there was a lot in this book to recommend it. Brinsley felt that organizing the book in sections by type of creature rather than just alphabetically like AD&D's Monster Manuals "should certainly make life easier for those DMs who design their own adventures, and know what sort of monster they want, rather than by name". He also felt that the comprehensive references to all the monsters appearing in the D&D boxed sets would solve the problem of having to remember in which set a particular monster appears. He concluded the review by stating, "basically, this book contains all you could ever wish to know about monsters in the D&D game, no matter what level your characters are ... if you've ever felt constrained by the limited range of D&D monsters, then this book is for you."

Reviews
White Wolf #38 (1993)

References

External links
AC9 Creature Catalogue at TSR Archive.
AC - Accessory Modules series at the Acaeum.

Dungeons & Dragons sourcebooks
Role-playing game supplements introduced in 1986